The Triffids were an Australian rock band from Perth, Western Australia. They have released five studio albums, one live album, ten singles, six extended plays, nine cassette tapes, four compilation albums and a video album. The Triffids formed in 1978 by mainstay David McComb, his school friend Alsy MacDonald together with Phil Kakulas. Their first release was a cassette tape, Triffids 1st recorded in May, by September they had added Byron Sinclair and released, Triffids 2nd with four more cassette tapes released by 1981. Considerable line-up changes had occurred resulting in McComb and MacDonald with Will Akers, Margaret Gillard, Robert McComb (David's older brother) and Mark Peters. "Stand Up", their first single, was released in July 1981 from Triffids 6th. Their first extended play, Reverie appeared in November 1982.

Treeless Plain, their first studio LP album, was released in November 1983. By then the line-up was the McComb brothers and MacDonald with Jill Birt and Martyn P. Casey. In August 1984, the band relocated to London where they recorded Born Sandy Devotional in 1985 which was released in early 1986 and reached the United Kingdom Top 30 Albums Chart. It spawned the single "Wide Open Road" in February, which peaked into the UK Top 30 and Australian Kent Music Report Singles Chart.

Studio albums

Live albums

Compilation albums

Extended plays

Cassettes

Singles

DVDs

Notes

References

General
 
 
 
 
 
Specific

External links

Discographies of Australian artists
Folk music discographies
Rock music group discographies